"Lovesick Girls" is a song recorded by South Korean girl group Blackpink, released on October 2, 2020, through YG Entertainment and Interscope Records, as the third single from the group's first Korean-language studio album, The Album (2020). It was written by Teddy, Løren, Danny Chung, and group members Jisoo and Jennie, while Teddy produced the song alongside 24 and R. Tee. "Lovesick Girls" is a dance-pop and electropop song with elements of EDM sound. Lyrically, the song deals with the pain after a heartbreak.

"Lovesick Girls" peaked at number two on the Billboard Global 200 and number one on the Global Excl. U.S., becoming Blackpink's first number-one hit on the latter chart. The song peaked at number two and became the longest-charting girl group song in the top ten of the Gaon Digital Chart in South Korea, and topped charts in Malaysia and Singapore. It also peaked at number 59 on the US Billboard Hot 100, and figured within the record charts in other 14 countries. The song was later certified Platinum in South Korea and Gold in Japan. An accompanying music video for the song was directed by Seo Hyun-seung and uploaded onto Blackpink's YouTube channel simultaneously with the single's release. It garnered 61.4 million views in its first 24 hours, becoming the sixth biggest 24-hour debut for a music video at the time. The song was performed with "Pretty Savage" on several music programs in South Korea including Show! Music Core and Inkigayo.

Background
Starting from September 22, the group's label uploaded various teasers for each member on their respective social media accounts. The song's name and release date were announced on September 28, 2020. The accompanying teaser poster features the group members leaning on one another with the song logo at the top alongside an official concept teaser. The song was further revealed to be the "main track" of its parent album. The next day, the official tracklist for the album was released via Twitter.

Composition 

"Lovesick Girls" was written by Løren, Danny Chung, Jisoo, Jennie, and Teddy Park while composition was handled by the latter two with David Guetta, 24, R. Tee, and Leah Haywood. The song has been described as a dance-pop and electropop song with an acoustic guitar and EDM sound. In terms of musical notation, the song is composed in the key of G-flat major, with a tempo of 128 beats per minute, and runs for three minutes and 14 seconds. Lyrically, the song deals with the pain after a heartbreak and not being able to find the perfect person to be with. Jisoo further commented on the track's concept, saying it is a song "that sends a hopeful message revolving around girls who are constantly hurt in relationships but again set out for a new love."

Critical reception 
The song was met with positive reviews from critics. Ranking it the second best track of the album, Billboard's Jason Lipshutz opined that the song "demonstrates Blackpink’s ambition, as they tackle well-worn subject matter with a fresh aesthetic." Callie Ahlgrim from Insider called "Lovesick Girls" a "EDM-flavored sequel" to Ariana Grande's smash hit "7 Rings" and noted that the lyrics "We are the lovesick girls" or "I'm nothing without this pain" are making this song a "heartbreak anthem".  Writing for Rolling Stone, Tim Chan wrote that the song "turns a familiar lament about being alone into an anthemic dance track that’s just begging for a lightstick and clubs to reopen". Hannah Zwick of Consequence of Sound described "Lovesick Girls" as "an album highlight, especially for the vocalists". Raul Stanciu from Sputnikmusic, positively compared the song to Blackpink's "As If It's Your Last", stating that the song "is probably the closest Blackpink have steered towards the lovely disco grooves". Erica Gonzales of Harper's Bazaar called it "a girl anthem" that showcases the band's range. Seventeens Tamara Fuentes named the song as "an upbeat track" that "will get you up and dancing as soon as the intro starts."

Commercial performance
"Lovesick Girls" debuted at number two on the Billboard Global 200 and at number one on the Global Excl. U.S. with 114 million streams and 17,000 downloads sold outside the U.S. and became Blackpink's first chart-topper on the latter. The song remained in the top ten for its second week on the Global Excl. U.S., dropping down to number five. In total, the song spent 14 weeks on the Global 200 and 25 weeks on the Global Excl. U.S. In the United States, following the release of its parent album The Album, "Lovesick Girls" debuted at number 59 on the Billboard Hot 100 as well as number nine on the Billboard Digital Song Sales chart and number 46 on the Billboard Streaming Songs chart, all dated October 17, 2020. On the same week, the song debuted atop the US Billboard World Digital Songs Chart, giving Blackpink their seventh chart-topper on the chart following their single "How You Like That".

In South Korea, the song debuted at number 28 on the Gaon Digital Chart on the week ending October 3, 2020, with less than two days of tracking. It rose to number two and peaked the following week; Blackpink's second track to do so, following "Kill This Love" in 2019. This marked their sixth top two hit, their seventh top three hit, and their eleventh top ten entry in the country. The single was the third best-performing song of October, peaking at number three on the Gaon Monthly Chart the same month. The song broke the record for the longest-charting girl group song in the top ten of the Gaon Digital Chart with 22 weeks, beating out the 17 weeks spent by "Cheer Up" by Twice and "Tell Me" by the Wonder Girls. "Lovesick Girls" went on to spend 22 weeks inside the top 10 and 65 weeks in the top 100 of the chart.

Elsewhere, the song debuted atop the national RIM Charts and RIAS of Malaysia and Singapore, respectively. In Europe, "Lovesick Girls" charted at number 76 in the Czech Republic, 38 in Hungary, 39 in Ireland, 23 in Portugal, 37 in Scotland and 78 in Slovakia. It reached number 40 on the UK Singles Chart. It was also commercially successful in Oceania, peaking at number 27 in Australia and 35 in New Zealand.

Music video

Background and synopsis 
The accompanying music video was released alongside the song. On September 30, the group released a 16-second teaser of the song and music video on their official YouTube channel. Blackpink broke their own personal record by surpassing 10 million views for the music video in less than 52 minutes (the group's previous record with their song "Ice Cream" surpassed 10 million views in two hours and 55 minutes). It surpassed 50 million views in only 18 hours since its release. It garnered 61.4 million views in its first 24 hours, making it the sixth most-viewed youtube video in 24 hours  for a music video at the time. On April 18, the music video hit 400 million views. The behind the scenes video was uploaded a day after the music video on October 3, 2020.  The dance practice video was uploaded on October 8, 2020. The video features the members in casual shorts and boots, dancing to the song in a rustic-looking dance.

The music video opens with Jennie, Lisa, Jisoo and Rosé sitting in a pink Oldsmobile in a field before flashbacking to the members getting into a heated argument in a crashed, graffiti-covered car on an urban street singing, "We are the lovesick girls/But we were born to be alone/Yeah, we were born to be alone/Yeah, we were born to be alone/But why we still looking for love." Lovesickness strikes them in many different ways, including moody walks in a day-glo field, guitar-smashing outbursts, choreographed late-night street dances, smashing car headlights with a sledgehammer, breathless midnight sprints through the city, angsty therapy sessions, a trip to a paintball range, and a food fight in a bodega.

Controversy 
Following the release of the music video for "Lovesick Girls", the Korean Health and Medical Workers Union raised concerns about member Jennie's nurse outfit which was featured in her solo scene. The union released a statement stating that YG Entertainment "sexually objectified the image of a nurse" in the video. Subsequently, YG Entertainment released a statement that they intended to replace the scene.

In popular culture
The song appeared as part of the original soundtrack of the Mexican film Anónima, released on December 10, 2021, where the film premiered on Netflix. "Lovesick Girls" was heard in the November 2022 The Simpsons episode "From Beer to Paternity", where Homer, Duffman, and Lisa sing along to the song on a road trip.

Accolades 
"Lovesick Girls" achieved the top spot on various South Korean weekly music programs, such as SBS' Inkigayo, KBS' Music Bank and MBC's Show! Music Core due to its success on digital platforms. The song won six music show awards, including three consecutive wins that led to receiving the "triple crown" award on Inkigayo.

Live performances 
Blackpink promoted the song on several music programs in South Korea including Show! Music Core and Inkigayo. On October 21, 2020, Blackpink performed "Lovesick Girls" on Good Morning America and Jimmy Kimmel Live!. On November 25, the group performed the song at the Waktu Indonesia Belanja, an event held by e-commerce platform Tokopedia.

Credits and personnel 
Credits adapted from Tidal and Melon.
 Blackpink – vocals
 Jisoo – lyricist
 Jennie – lyrics, composition
 Teddy – producer, lyrics, composition
 24 – producer, composition, arrangement
 R. Tee – producer, composition, arrangement
 Løren – lyricist 
 Danny Chung – lyricist 
 Brian Lee – composition 
 Leah Haywood – lyrics, composition
 David Guetta – lyrics, composition
 Co-sho – lyricist (Japanese version)
 Jason Roberts – mixing

Charts

Weekly charts

Monthly charts

Year-end charts

Certifications

Release history

See also

 List of Billboard Global Excl. U.S. number ones of 2020
 List of certified songs in South Korea
 List of Inkigayo Chart winners (2020)
 List of K-pop songs on the Billboard charts
 List of most-viewed online videos in the first 24 hours
 List of M Countdown Chart winners (2020)
 List of Music Bank Chart winners (2020)
 List of number-one songs of 2020 (Malaysia)
 List of number-one songs of 2020 (Singapore)

References 

2020 singles
2020 songs
Blackpink songs
Interscope Records singles
Number-one singles in Malaysia
Number-one singles in Singapore
Songs written by Brian Lee (songwriter)
Songs written by David Guetta
Songs written by Leah Haywood
Songs written by Teddy Park
YG Entertainment singles
Billboard Global Excl. U.S. number-one singles
electropop songs
electronic dance music songs
dance pop songs
Music video controversies